World's Funniest Videos is an American reality television series that aired on ABC from February 1, 1996 to June 20, 1996.

Synopsis

There is a different show with a similar name called World's Funniest Videos: Top 10 Countdown.

Seasons

References

1996 American television series debuts
1996 American television series endings
American Broadcasting Company original programming
1990s American video clip television series
1990s American reality television series